Coda is a cloud-based multi-user document editor.

Features 

Coda is a document editor that uses features from spreadsheets, presentation documents, word processor files, and apps. Possible uses for Coda documents include using them as a wiki, database, or project management tool. Coda has built a formula system, much like spreadsheets commonly have, but in Coda documents, formulas can be used anywhere within the document, and can link to things that aren't just cells, including other documents, calendars or graphs. Coda also has the ability to integrate with custom third-party services, and has automations. It has offered $1 million in grants for developers that create such integrations.

Development 
Coda Project, Inc. was founded by Shishir Mehrotra and Alex DeNeui in June 2014, who met at MIT. They developed the project mostly privately before a public beta was announced in October 2017. The company was named Coda, which is an anadrome for "a doc". Coda raised $60 million in venture capital funding over two rounds by 2017. The Coda software came out of beta in February 2019. Version 1.0 had an improved user interface, new features for folders and workspaces, and permission levels for accessing files. Coda raised another $80 million in 2020, and $100 million in 2021. The 2021, funding brought Coda's valuation to $1.4 billion, making it a unicorn.

See also 
 Cloud collaboration
 Collaborative software
 Collaborative real-time editor
 Document collaboration

References

External links 
 

Collaborative real-time editors
Web applications
Online word processors
Online spreadsheets